Sepia chirotrema is a species of cuttlefish native to the southern Indo-Pacific, specifically from Investigator Strait, southern Australia to
Dirk Hartog Island, western Australia. It lives at a depth of between 120 and 210 m.

Sepia chirotrema grows to a mantle length of approximately 200 mm.

The type specimen was collected in the Investigator Strait area, south of Kangaroo Island. It was deposited at the Australian Museum in Sydney but no longer exists.

References

External links

Cuttlefish
Fauna of Western Australia
Molluscs described in 1918
Taxa named by Samuel Stillman Berry